Anosh Ekka is a Politician and ex Cabinet Minister of Jharkhand Government. At present Anosh Ekka is holding the post of National President (Supremo) of 
Jharkhand Party. Anosh Ekka is very popular and famous politician of Jharkhand and he was the  member of Jharkhand Legislative Assembly from 2005 to 2018. Anosh Ekka won the Kolebira Vidhan Sabha seats 3 times continuously in 2005, 2010 and 2015 from Jharkhand Party ticket. He was Cabinet Minister in Jharkhand government from 2005 to 2008 in Arjun Munda and  Madhu Koda Government.
Anosh Ekka holds the different ministries of Transport Minister, Rural Development Minister and Bhawan Nirman Mantralya as Jharkhand State Cabinet Minister. During Ekka's ministry much development work and many schemes were launched in the Jharkhand. In 2014, during Member of parliament Election Anosh Ekka lost the election by very short difference of votes from Khunti Lok Sabha seats as Jharkhand Party candidate.

In 2006 Anosh Ekka played the key role of Madhu Koda Government formation. Anosh Ekka and Madhu Koda are very popular and powerful tribal leaders of Jharkhand.

References

Jharkhand MLAs 2014–2019
Crime in Jharkhand
Corruption in Jharkhand
Living people
Year of birth missing (living people)
Jharkhand Party politicians